Vladimir Balluku (born 7 October 1951) is an Albanian footballer. He played in two matches for the Albania national football team from 1971 to 1972.

References

External links
 

1951 births
Living people
Albanian footballers
Albania international footballers
Place of birth missing (living people)
Association football midfielders
FK Partizani Tirana players
KF Tirana players